Manayek is an Israeli television police procedural series. Season 1 was released in 2020 and Season 2 in 2022, each comprising 10 episodes. It was broadcast on Israel's public broadcaster, Kan 11.

Plot
Izzy Bachar is an ex-policeman who works for the internal police investigations unit. He is assigned to a case in which one of his oldest best friends, Barak Harel, has been implicated.

Cast
 Shalom Assayag as Izzy Bachar
 Amos Tamam as Barak Harel
 Ishai Golan as Eitan Doltsch
 Liraz Chamami as Tal Ben Harush
 Doron Ben-David as Ofir Leibowitz ("Leibo")
 Maya Dagan as Ronit Meinzer

Production
The series was created by Roy Iddan and Yoav Gross, directed by Alon Zingman (who also directed the 2013 drama series Shtisel), and produced by Yoav Gross Productions.

The word manayek is a slang term in Hebrew for the police (or alternatively  snitch), translated in the series as "Rats". The plot concerns an investigation into police corruption.

Release
The first season went to air in 2020 on Kan 11. Cineflix Rights sold the series to HBO in Latin America, and Arte for release in France and Germany.

The second season aired from 23 June 2022 in Israel.

In Australia, both series were shown on SBS on Demand in 2022.

Reception and accolades
The first season of Manayek was one of Kan 11's highest-rated dramas ever.

Season 1 won Best Drama Series, Best Director in a Drama Series, Best Screenplay for a Drama Series, Best Leading Actor in a Drama Series, and Best Supporting Actor in a Drama Series at the 2021 Israeli Academy of Film and Television Awards.

References

External links

2020 Israeli television series debuts
Israeli drama television series
Television shows set in Israel
2020s crime drama television series
2020s police procedural television series
Kan 11 original programming